Summit Mills is an unincorporated community in Somerset County, Pennsylvania, United States.

Postal history 
The first postmaster in Summit Mills was Ephraim Miller, appointed November 24, 1852. Summit Mills had a post office through at least 1906, but was served by the post office in Meyersdale by 1909.

Religious history 
Early settlers of Summit Mills, including the Yoder and Hostetler families, were Amish. A congregation of Church of the Brethren was organized in Summit Mills in the fall of 1883 and a church was built in 1884.

References

Unincorporated communities in Somerset County, Pennsylvania
Unincorporated communities in Pennsylvania